The Puerto Rico national handball team is the national team of Puerto Rico. It takes part in international handball competitions.

Tournament record

Pan American Championship

Pan American Games
1995 – 6th
1999 – 7th
2003 – 6th

Central American and Caribbean Games

Caribbean Handball Cup
2013 – 3rd

Nor.Ca Championship

Team

References

External links
IHF profile

Handball
Men's national handball teams